Jonet-Pastré was a French sailor who represented his country at the 1900 Summer Olympics in Meulan, France. Jonet-Pastré as crew, was disqualified in first race of the 0.5 to 1 ton and did not finish in the second race. He did this with the boat Sidi-Fekkar.

Further reading

References

External links

French male sailors (sport)
Sailors at the 1900 Summer Olympics – .5 to 1 ton
Olympic sailors of France
Sailors at the 1900 Summer Olympics – Open class
Year of birth missing
Year of death missing
Place of birth missing
Place of death missing